USS Abraham Lincoln (CVN-72) is the fifth  in the United States Navy. She is the second Navy ship to have been named after the former President Abraham Lincoln. Her home port is NAS North Island, San Diego, California; she is a member of the United States Pacific Fleet. She is administratively responsible to Commander, Naval Air Forces Pacific, and operationally serves as the flagship of Carrier Strike Group 3 and host to Carrier Air Wing Nine. She was returned to the fleet on 12 May 2017, marking the successful completion of her Refueling and complex overhaul (RCOH) carried out at Newport News Shipyard. On 1 April 2019, USS Abraham Lincoln was deployed to the Middle East as the flagship for Carrier Strike Group 12 and Carrier Air Wing Seven assigned to her.

Abraham Lincoln Carrier Strike Group 
Abraham Lincoln is part of Carrier Strike Group Three (CSG-3) with Carrier Air Wing Nine (CVW-9) embarked, with Abraham Lincoln as the flagship of the strike group and the home of the commander of Destroyer Squadron 21.

Ships of Destroyer Squadron 21 
  – 
  – Arleigh Burke-class destroyer
  – Arleigh Burke-class destroyer
  – Arleigh Burke-class destroyer

Squadrons of CVW-9 
 Strike Fighter Squadron 41 (VFA-41) "Black Aces" with Boeing F/A-18F Super Hornets
 Strike Fighter Squadron 14 (VFA-14) "Tophatters" with F/A-18E Super Hornets
 Marine Fighter Attack Squadron 314 (VMFA-314) "Black Knights" with Lockheed Martin F-35C Lightning IIs
 Strike Fighter Squadron 151 (VFA-151) "Vigilantes" with F/A-18E Super Hornets
 Electronic Attack Squadron 133 (VAQ-133) "Wizards" with Boeing EA-18G Growlers
 Carrier Airborne Early Warning Squadron 117 (VAW-117) "Wallbangers" with Northrop Grumman E-2D Hawkeyes
 Helicopter Sea Combat Squadron 14 (HSC-14) "Chargers" with Sikorsky MH-60S Seahawks
 Helicopter Maritime Strike Squadron 71 (HSM-71) "Raptors" with MH-60R Seahawks
 Fleet Logistics Support Squadron 30 Detachment 2 (VRM-30) "Titans" with Bell Boeing CMV-22B Osprey

Ship history

Construction 
Abraham Lincolns contract was awarded to Newport News Shipbuilding on 27 December 1982; her keel was laid 3 November 1984 at Newport News, Virginia. The ship was launched on 13 February 1988 and commissioned on 11 November 1989. She cost $4.726 billion in 2010 dollars.

1990 to 1999 
Abraham Lincoln was transferred to the Pacific in September 1990 performing Gringo-Gaucho with the Argentine Naval Aviation during the transit. On 5 November 1990, as Abraham Lincoln was anchored in Valparaíso, Frente Patriótico Manuel Rodríguez guerrillas detonated a bomb inside the restaurant Max und Moritz, in the seaside resort of Viña del Mar, wounding three of her sailors.

Abraham Lincolns maiden Western Pacific deployment came unexpectedly on 28 May 1991 in response to Operation Desert Shield/Desert Storm. The ship had the staffs of Commander, Carrier Group Three, Rear Admiral Timothy W. Wright, and Destroyer Squadron 9 embarked, as well as Carrier Air Wing Eleven. She was accompanied by a seven-ship battle group.

While heading towards the Indian Ocean, the ship was diverted to support evacuation operations after Mount Pinatubo erupted on Luzon Island in the Philippines. In support of Operation Fiery Vigil, Abraham Lincoln led a 23-ship armada that moved over 45,000 people from the Subic Bay Naval Station to the port of Cebu in the Visayas. It was the largest peacetime evacuation of active military personnel and their families in history. One baby was born onboard Abraham Lincoln during the evacuation; his mother named him Abraham Lincoln Prestera. After Fiery Vigil, Abraham Lincoln steamed toward the Persian Gulf, to run reconnaissance and combat air patrols in Iraq and Kuwait, assisting allied and US troops involved with Desert Storm. In early 1992, the ship was at Naval Air Station Alameda on Ship's Restricted Availability for minor maintenance and refitting.

From June 1993, Abraham Lincoln was the flagship of Commander, Carrier Group Three. In October 1993, the carrier was ordered to the coast of Somalia to assist UN humanitarian operations. For four weeks, Abraham Lincoln flew air patrols over Mogadishu in support of Operation Restore Hope.

Abraham Lincoln was to be the first Pacific Fleet carrier to integrate female aviators into the crew after the Combat Exclusion Laws were lifted on 28 April 1993. The ship left San Diego on 24 October 1994, to begin refresher training. The next day, Lieutenant Kara Spears Hultgreen, the first female F-14 Tomcat pilot, died when her plane crashed into the sea. Her F-14 suffered a compressor stall as she made her final approach, losing power to one of the engines. She aborted the landing to the best of her ability in an effort to prevent a collision with the aft end of the ship and the plane inverted and went into the ocean. Radar intercept officer Lieutenant Matthew Klemish ejected safely from the plane and was rescued from the water minutes later, but Hultgreen, who was automatically ejected 0.4 seconds after Klemish, rocketed straight into the ocean and was instantly killed. Her body, still strapped in the ejection seat, was recovered 19 days later.

Abraham Lincolns third deployment began in April 1995 when she was sent to the Persian Gulf and took part in Southern Watch and in Operation Vigilant Sentinel. Abraham Lincoln was able to continue on with her mission, while Sacramento had to dock at Jebel Ali, UAE, for several weeks for repair.

Operation Infinite Reach 
Abraham Lincoln began a fourth deployment in June 1998. Once again, the ship headed for the Persian Gulf in support of operation Southern Watch. During this deployment, the Abraham Lincoln carrier battle group launched Tomahawk cruise missiles against two sites. The first was a Sudanese pharmaceutical factory suspected of assisting Osama bin Laden in making chemical weapons. The second was Bin Laden's terrorist training camps in Afghanistan. These strikes were ordered by President Bill Clinton 13 days after terrorists bombed the US embassies in Kenya and Tanzania and was codenamed Operation Infinite Reach. Abraham Lincoln was awarded the Armed Forces Expeditionary Medal, and Abraham Lincoln carrier battle group the Meritorious Unit Commendation ribbon for their participation.

2000s 
The carrier's fifth deployment commenced in August 2000, when Abraham Lincoln again traveled to the Persian Gulf in support of Southern Watch. On this deployment, the carrier, air wing, and battle group ships earned the Navy Meritorious Unit Commendation. Additionally, the ship earned the prestigious Arleigh Burke Award as the most improved command in the Pacific Fleet.

Abraham Lincoln was in port on 11 September 2001. The carrier was put to sea on 20 July 2002 to support Operation Enduring Freedom. She took up station once more in support of Operation Southern Watch before taking a port visit to Perth, Western Australia. During this time, Abraham Lincoln was ordered to the Persian Gulf to take part in Operation Iraqi Freedom. This forced the Navy to extend Abraham Lincolns stay from 20 January 2003 to 6 May 2003. The news of this extension was delivered to the ship's crew on New Year's morning by the then battlegroup commander, Rear Admiral Kelly, with the phrase, "We don't need to be home holding our loved ones, we need to be here holding the line. Get over it!"  The term "Get over it" became the running joke aboard ship, which eventually led to a deployment patch made aboard that read "Westpac 2003 CVN-72 CVW-14 GET OVER IT" with an image intended to depict an admiral kicking a sailor in the groin.

Abraham Lincoln and the carrier battle group and airwing helped deliver the opening salvos and air strikes in Operation Iraqi Freedom. During the airwing's deployment, some 16,500 sorties were flown and 1.6 million pounds of ordnance were used. The carrier returned home in May 2003, in the process receiving a visit from President George W. Bush before officially ending Abraham Lincolns deployment by docking at San Diego before returning to homeport in Everett, Washington. Bush stated at the time that this was the end to major combat operations in Iraq. While this statement did coincide with an end to the conventional phase of the war, Bush's assertion—and a sign displayed during his visit—became controversial after guerrilla warfare in Iraq increased during the Iraqi insurgency. The vast majority of casualties, both military and civilian, occurred after the speech. The White House said their services constructed the banner. As explained by Cmdr. Conrad Chun, a Navy spokesman, "The banner was a Navy idea, the ship's idea. The idea popped up in one of the meetings aboard the ship preparing for her homecoming and thought it would be good to have a banner, 'Mission Accomplished.' The sailors then asked if the White House could get the sign made. ... The banner signified the successful completion of the ship's deployment," Cmdr. Chun continued, noting that Abraham Lincoln was deployed 290 days, longer than any other nuclear-powered aircraft carrier in history. This record would later be broken in 2020.

In June 2004, following a 10-month docking period, the ship put to sea for the start of working up prior to deployment. During this period, a film crew was hosted aboard to produce scenes for the film Stealth, which included the presence of a full-scale model of a fictional aircraft, the F/A-37 Talon, that would feature as operating from the carrier. On 1 October 2004, the carrier's controlling formation was redesignated from Cruiser-Destroyer Group Three to Carrier Strike Group Nine. Abraham Lincoln departed for her next voyage on 15 October 2004. The carrier was on a port call in Hong Kong when the 9.0-magnitude 2004 Indian Ocean earthquake struck southern Asia on 26 December 2004. To help with the international relief effort and assist with search and rescue efforts already underway, Abraham Lincoln deployed to the hard-hit western coast of Sumatra to provide humanitarian assistance. The deployment was designated Operation Unified Assistance. Abraham Lincolns Air Transportation Office coordinated the flow of supplies into the region, and the carrier provided air traffic control for the relief effort. Sailors from Abraham Lincolns Engineering Department Repair Division designed a potable water manifold to help bring fresh water to Aceh Province, Sumatra, with the system beginning to ship the much-needed fresh water on 4 January. Carrier Strike Group Three received the Humanitarian Service Medal in recognition of its humanitarian assistance/disaster response (HA/DR) efforts during the OUA mission.

In mid-January 2005, the carrier left Indonesian waters after the Indonesian government refused to allow fighter pilots assigned to Abraham Lincoln to conduct air patrols and training flights. By law, US carrier-based pilots must practice at least once every two to three weeks to remain "fit", otherwise they are grounded. Despite the move into international waters, Abraham Lincoln continued to provide support to the region until 4 February. During the carrier's 33 days on station, she, along with her battle group, Carrier Strike Group Nine delivered 5.7 million pounds of relief supplies. The 17 helicopters assigned to HSL-47 Saberhawks and HS-2 "Golden Falcons", attached to CVW-2 flew 1,747 relief missions along the western coast of Sumatra. The carrier's departure coincided with the arrival of the hospital ship .

Between 7 March – 27 May 2005, Abraham Lincoln underwent a docking planned incremental availability yard overhaul at Naval Station Everett, Washington, and following subsequent sustainment training, the carrier underwent an additional planned incremental availability at NS Everett between 28 June and 26 August 2005. Between 1 and 23 June 2005, Abraham Lincoln and Carrier Air Wing Two (CVW-2) trained in the northern Pacific, conducting their quarterly Integrated Strike Group (ISG) Sustainment Training cycle. Abraham Lincoln carried out surge sustainment training for the Fleet Response Plan, fleet replacement squadron carrier qualifications, and Joint Task Force Exercise 2005 in southern Californian waters between 19 October and 16 November 2005.

On 18 December 2006, Abraham Lincoln left the dry dock at the shipyard ahead of schedule and under budget. The Puget Sound Naval Shipyard and Intermediate Maintenance Facility completed ship tank maintenance in less than half the scheduled time. In 89 days, 18 tanks were completed. The Tank Value Stream Team achieved this by partnering with Ship's Force and the Abraham Lincoln Project Team. While in dry dock, the whole ship was painted by the crew at nights and on weekends rather than waiting for contractors to do the job.

On 5 January 2006, the carrier Abraham Lincoln departed her homeport of Everett, Washington, and transited to San Diego, California, for a scheduled underway period to undertake sustainment training exercises and post-refit inspection by the US Navy's Board of Inspection and Survey.  Abraham Lincoln completed her additional sustainment training in southern Californian waters 21–24 February 2006.

The refit was completed on 26 March 2007, when Rear Adm. Scott R. Van Buskirk assumed command of Carrier Strike Group Nine from Rear Adm. Bill Goodwin.

On 29 August 2006, the carrier Abraham Lincoln arrived at Naval Base Kitsap in Bremerton, Washington, and on 8 September 2006, the carrier entered Dry Dock No. 6 at the Puget Sound Naval Shipyard and Intermediate Maintenance Facility to begin a scheduled Docked Planned Incremental Availability (DPIA) yard maintenance period. Major projects for this DPIA included the refurbishment of ship tanks, work on three of the four catapults, modernization of navigation systems, resurfacing of the flight deck, and updates to the ship's local area network. Abraham Lincoln also received installation of the RIM-116 Rolling Airframe Missile system, which improved the ship's close-range defensive capabilities. On 18 December 2008, Abraham Lincoln left dry dock ahead of schedule and under budget because the PSNS and IMF yard teams were able to cut the time of ship tank maintenance by more than half, completing 18 tanks in 89 days.

The aircraft carrier Abraham Lincoln held a fast cruise from the pier from 23 to 25 June and left Puget Sound on 26 June to conduct sea trials before returning to her homeport of Naval Station Everett, Washington, on 30 June 2007.

Abraham Lincoln underwent flight deck carrier qualifications while sailing in southern Californian waters 12–15 July 2007. F/A-18E Super Hornets and F/A-18C Hornets from strike squadrons VFA-137 and VFA-151 joined VX-23 test pilots performed precision approach drills to ensure that the ship's equipment, such as the Precision Approach Landing System, operated within close tolerances, with SH-60B Seahawks from squadron HS-2 providing search and rescue capabilities during flight operations.

On 20 August 2007, Abraham Lincoln and embarked Carrier Air Wing Two completed their 25-day Tailored Ship's Training Availability (TSTA) and Final Evaluation Problem (FEP) training period off southern California. TSTA is designed to prepare the ship and crew for full integration into a carrier strike group, and FEP is a graded 48-hour evolution to evaluate how well the units learned during TSTA. Abraham Lincoln and embarked CVW-2 aircraft conducted over 1,000 fixed-wing sorties. Abraham Lincoln completed five replenishments-at-sea evolutions, including two with the fleet replenishment oiler , and participated in 18 general quarters (GQ) drills. Also, on 13 August, Abraham Lincoln tested her defensive capabilities when she fired four RIM-7P NATO Sea Sparrow missiles, with two of them at BQM-74E Chukar remote-operated aerial target drones.

Carrier Strike Group Nine's Composite Unit Training Exercise featured 24 sailors from Mobile Security Squadron 2 (MSRON-2), Helicopter Visit, Board, Search and Seizure Team 1, a first for West Coast-based U.S. Navy ships. MSRON-2 Team 1 specializes in boarding noncompliant ships at sea in the dead of night, detaining the crew if necessary, and identifying suspected terrorists or subjects of interest, using the element of surprise afforded by helicopter insertion, night vision equipment, and state-of-the-art biometrics. MSRON-2 Team 1 was established in 2004 at Norfolk Naval Shipyard in Portsmouth, Virginia, and it was the first team of its kind to reach operational status.

Rescuers successfully pulled all seven crewmembers from the water.

Between 3 and 30 January 2008, Carrier Strike Group Nine conducted antisubmarine exercises and Joint Task Force Exercise 03-08 (JTFEx 03–08) off southern California. On 16 January, Secretary of the Navy Donald C. Winter visited the strike group's flagship, Abraham Lincoln. On 20 January, a NATO Boeing E-3A Sentry Airborne Warning and Control System aircraft was deployed from NATO Air Base Geilenkirchen, Germany, with a multinational crew aboard for JTFEx 03–08, defended Carrier Strike Group Nine from a simulated air attack (30 January).

Abraham Lincoln began a planned incremental availability maintenance cycle at the Puget Sound Naval Shipyard in Bremerton, Washington, on 16 April 2009. The objective of this cycle is to refurbish Abraham Lincolns shipboard system to meet the anticipated 50-year service life of the ship, including an upgraded local area network system. Beginning 1 December 2009, Abraham Lincoln began daily flying squad, general quarters, and integrated training team drills in preparation for her first underway period following the ship's current maintenance cycle.

2010 
On 13 January 2010, the carrier completed upgrades and repair that cost $250 million at Puget Sound Naval Shipyard. The carrier was to be assigned to Carrier Strike Group Nine.
On 3 February 2011, the ship was awarded the Battle Effectiveness Award for high standards of excellence and combat readiness.

2011 

On 1 March 2011, the news media reported that the US Navy had awarded Northrop Grumman Shipbuilding-Newport News a US$206.7 million option under a previously awarded contract to plan Abraham Lincolns RCOH. The planning contract covered the design, documentation, engineering, advanced material procurement, inspections, fabrication, and support work for Abraham Lincolns RCOH, with more than 1,000 employees supporting this planning phase. Additional funding for the RCOH was pending the passage of the U.S. Department of Defense's Fiscal Year 2011 budget appropriations by the U.S. Congress. Upon authorization, Abraham Lincolns RCOH was anticipated to begin in 2013, and is scheduled to take between three and four years to complete at an estimated overall cost of US$3 billion.

On 1 August 2011, the US Navy announced that Abraham Lincoln would shift homeport from Everett, Washington, to Newport News, Virginia, for a scheduled RCOH in August 2012. The ship departed Everett for the deployment that would take the carrier around the world to Newport News in December 2011.

2012 
From 6–10 January, accompanied by guided missile cruiser , Abraham Lincoln visited the Gulf of Thailand port of Laem Chabang. During the visit, Singapore-based Glenn Defense Marine Asia (GDMA) provided husbanding services, for which the Navy was billed $884,000. In November 2013, federal prosecutors charged that the Navy had been overbilled more than $500,000.

On 22 January 2012, the US Navy announced that Abraham Lincoln had entered the Persian Gulf "without incident."  The deployment through the Straits of Hormuz came at a time of escalating tensions with Iran. Abraham Lincoln, accompanied by a strike group of warships, was the first U.S. aircraft carrier to enter the Persian Gulf since late December 2011 and was on a "routine rotation" to replace the outgoing .

The departure of John C. Stennis prompted Iranian army chief Ataollah Salehi to threaten action if another carrier passed back into the Persian Gulf, saying, "I recommend and emphasize to the American carrier not to return to the Persian Gulf. ... We are not in the habit of warning more than once," The US dismissed the warning.

In June, the actors, crew and producers of the film, Abraham Lincoln: Vampire Hunter attended an unconventional preview screening for the over eighteen hundred sailors aboard the namesake vessel of the 16th president. The event marked the first time a major motion picture had its debut screening for troops deployed in the Middle East.

Abraham Lincoln transited the Suez Canal northbound on 16 July 2012 and the Strait of Gibraltar on 26 July 2012 en route to the United States. On 7 August 2012, Abraham Lincoln arrived at Norfolk Naval Station following an eight-month deployment to the US Navy's 5th, 6th and 7th Fleet areas of responsibility, in preparation for the Refueling and Complex Overhaul (RCOH) at Newport News.

2013 
On 8 February 2013, the U.S. Department of Defense announced that the scheduled mid-life Refueling and Complex Overhaul intended for Abraham Lincoln would be postponed pending the resolution of the upcoming budget sequestration.  This budget shortfall would not only affect Abraham Lincolns refueling of her nuclear propulsion plant, but it would also delay the next scheduled mid-life complex overhaul involving  forward-based in Yokosuka, Japan, as well as the de-fueling of the recently deactivated . By March 2013 Naval ship maintenance and overhaul budget issues had been addressed enough such that Abraham Lincolns RCOH had been confirmed and the ship was made ready to tow over to Newport News Shipbuilding. By mid-March she had been towed over and docked, and the RCOH work had begun.

2014 
On 3 October 2014, Huntington Ingalls Newport News Shipbuilding said that its workers had transferred a 30-ton anchor from Enterprise, the Navy's first and oldest nuclear carrier, to be installed aboard Abraham Lincoln during that week. The transfer was a result of an anchor replacement on Abraham Lincoln coinciding with the withdrawal of Enterprise, preserving the anchor rather than it being scrapped with the rest of the ship.

2017 

On 9 May 2017, Abraham Lincoln got underway for sea trials, following the four-year refueling and complex overhaul. More than 2.5 million man-hours of work were conducted aboard the ship, including refueling the reactors, upgrading ship's infrastructure and modernizing combat systems and air wing capabilities to increase combat effectiveness.

On 12 May 2017, Abraham Lincoln was redelivered to the fleet. The vessels joined  already on station.

2018 
On 2 August 2018, it was announced that Abraham Lincoln would return to San Diego as part of a home port shift for three carriers, thus returning her to the Pacific Fleet. At the end of August 2018, VFA-125 began operating from Abraham Lincoln as an integrated part of CVW-7, the first time that the F-35C had operated integrated cyclic operations, simulating the full spectrum of planned operations.

Also in August, a movie crew was aboard filming flight deck operations and flying sequences for the sequel Top Gun: Maverick off the coast of Virginia.

2019 
On 1 April 2019, Abraham Lincoln and Carrier Strike Group 12 departed Norfolk for a six-month deployment that will end with a shifting of homeport to San Diego. On 9 April she arrived in the United States Sixth Fleet area of operations, where she would operate in the Mediterranean Sea before proceeding to the Persian Gulf, then the Indian Ocean and the South China Sea, before heading across the Pacific Ocean to her new homeport in San Diego. On 5 May 2019 this deployment was diverted to the Middle East due to tensions with Iran and headed to the Persian Gulf. Her transit was expedited by omitting a port visit to Split, Croatia.

On 23 April 2019, Abraham Lincoln was reported to have operated simultaneously along with John C. Stennis in the Mediterranean Sea, the two carrier strike groups' operations including more than 130 aircraft, 10 ships, and 9,000 sailors and marines, according to the press release published by the U.S. Naval Forces Europe-Africa/US 6th Fleet. The operations were observed from the aircraft carrier by U.S. Ambassador to Russia, Jon Huntsman and Admiral James Foggo, commander, U.S. Naval Forces Europe-Africa and Joint Force Command Naples. While aboard, Huntsman said: "Diplomatic communication and dialogue coupled with the strong defense these ships provide demonstrate to Russia that if it truly seeks better relations with the United States, it must cease its destabilizing activities around the world."

2020 

Abraham Lincoln arrived in her new homeport in San Diego on 20 January following a record-breaking 295 days at sea, the longest post-Cold War era deployment for a US carrier, breaking her own record in the process.

On 18 December, the Navy announced Captain Amy Bauernschmidt would take command of Abraham Lincoln in following summer of 2021, the first time a woman will command an aircraft carrier.

2021 
Captain Amy Bauernschmidt, who previously served as the carrier's executive officer from 2016 to 2019, relieved Captain Walt Slaughter at a change of command ceremony in San Diego on 19 August.

Five crew members were killed while one was rescued during subsequent search and rescue operations.

2022 
On 4 January, Marine Fighter Attack Squadron 314 (VMFA-314) became the first Marine Corps F-35C squadron to be deployed on an aircraft carrier.

On 21 May, Abraham Lincoln steamed into Tokyo Bay to relieve .

The Abraham Lincoln carrier strike group is scheduled to participate in RIMPAC 2022.

On 11 November, Abraham Lincoln hosted a college basketball game on her deck between Gonzaga University and Michigan State University, won 64–63 by Gonzaga.

The carrier suffered a minor fire that injured 9 sailors on 29 November. The cause is unknown and an investigation was launched.

Gallery

See also 
 2003 Mission Accomplished Speech
 List of aircraft carriers
 List of aircraft carriers of the United States Navy
 Modern United States Navy carrier air operations

References

Sources 
 USS Abraham Lincoln (CVN-72) command histories – Naval History & Heritage Command

 1989 
 1990 
 1991 
 1992 
 1993 

 1994 
 1995 
 1996 
 1997 
 1998 

 1999 
 2001 
 2002 
 2003 
 2004 

 g

External links 

 
 Maritimequest USS Abraham Lincoln CVN-72 pages
 Story Archive – U.S. Navy, USS Abraham Lincoln (CVN-72)
 USS Abraham Lincoln history at U.S. Carriers
 

 

Nimitz-class aircraft carriers
1988 ships
Cold War aircraft carriers of the United States
Aircraft carriers of the United States
Nuclear ships of the United States Navy
Ships built in Newport News, Virginia